Muhammadgarh may refer to:
 Muhammadgarh State, a former polity in India
 Muhammadgarh, India
 Muhammadgarh, Pakistan